Golden Road is the third studio album by Australian country music singer Keith Urban. It was released on 8 October 2002 via Capitol Records Nashville. The album includes the singles "Somebody Like You", "Raining on Sunday", "Who Wouldn't Wanna Be Me", and "You'll Think of Me". This was Urban's first album to be produced by Dann Huff, who has produced all of his albums since.

Content
This album produced four singles: "Somebody Like You", "Raining on Sunday", "Who Wouldn't Wanna Be Me", and "You'll Think of Me", which all made it to the Top 10 on the U.S. Billboard Hot Country Songs chart. "Somebody Like You", "Who Wouldn't Wanna Be Me", and "You'll Think of Me" all reached number one, while "Raining on Sunday" peaked at number three. "Raining on Sunday" was originally recorded by Radney Foster on the 1998 album See What You Want to See, with a backing vocal from Darius Rucker of Hootie & the Blowfish. "Jeans On" is a cover of a Lord David Dundas song.

The song "You Look Good in My Shirt" was originally slated to be the album's fifth single; however, Capitol Nashville instead chose to release a single from a new album; despite its withdrawal, the song charted at number 60 from unsolicited airplay as an album cut. Urban re-recorded the song in 2008 for a re-issue of his compilation album Greatest Hits: 18 Kids and released that version as a single that same year. The re-recorded version was a number-one single in 2008.

Urban co-produced tracks 1, 3, 5, 7, 10, and 11 with Dann Huff, and he produced the rest of the album all by himself.

Commercial performance
Golden Road debuted at number eleven on the US Billboard 200 and number two on the BillboardTop Country Albums chart, selling 66,500 copies in its first week. As of September 2004, the album has sold 1.8 million copies in the US. On 22 September 2005, the album was certified triple platinum by the Recording Industry Association of America (RIAA) for sales of over three million copies in the United States.

Track listing

Personnel
As listed in liner notes.
Keith Urban – lead vocals, lead guitar, acoustic guitar, EBow, ganjo, piano, cardboard box
Tim Akers – keyboards, Hammond B-3 organ
Tom Bukovac – rhythm guitar
Matt Chamberlain – drums, drum loops
Eric Darken – percussion
Dan Dugmore – rhythm guitar
Jerry Flowers – background vocals
Aubrey Haynie – fiddle
John Hobbs – piano, keyboards
Dann Huff – rhythm guitar
Scotty Huff – background vocals
Chris McHugh – drums, percussion
Jason Mowery – mandolin, Dobro
Steve Nathan – keyboards
Monty Powell – background vocals
Jimmie Lee Sloas – bass guitar
Russell Terrell – background vocals
Glenn Worf – bass guitar

Charts

Weekly charts

Year-end charts

Singles

Certifications

References

2002 albums
ARIA Award-winning albums
Keith Urban albums
Capitol Records albums
Albums produced by Dann Huff